In politics, the opposition comprises one or more political parties or other organized groups that are opposed, primarily ideologically, to the government (or, in American English, the administration), party or group in political control of a city, region, state, country or other political body. The degree of opposition varies according to political conditions. For example, in authoritarian and democratic systems, opposition may be respectively repressed or desired. Members of an opposition generally serve as antagonists to the other parties.

Scholarship focusing on opposition politics didn't become popular or sophisticated until the mid-20th century. Recent studies have found that popular unrest regarding the economy and quality of life can be used by political opposition to mobilize and to demand change. Scholars have debated whether political opposition can benefit from political instability and economic crises, while some conclude the opposite. Case studies in Jordan align with mainstream thought in that political opposition can benefit from instability, while case studies in Morocco display a lack of oppositional mobilization in response to instability. In the Jordan case study, scholars reference opposition increasingly challenge those in power as political and economic instability proliferated wereas the opposition in Morocco did not mobilize on the instability. 

Furthermore, research on opposition politics in South Asia has helped inform researchers on possibilities of democratic renewal post-backsliding as well as possibilities of political violence.  Despite there being aggressive and powerful regimes in place in various South Asian countries, the opposition still poses a powerful counter-party. For example, members of opposition have made their way into office in Nepal and Sri Lanka has been hosting elections in regions known to previously not hold them. In these cases, the presence of opposition has brought about positive democratic change.

Political opposition through social media communication 
As social media has become a larger part of society and culture around the world, so too has online political opposition. Online communication as a whole has also heightened the spread of clearer political opposition. Various factors like censorship, selective censoring, polarization, and echo chambers have changed the way that political opposition presents itself.  Many Americans also believe that Social Media sites censor political viewpoints especially when they contradict the status quo.

See also
 His Majesty's loyal opposition (disambiguation)
 Leader of the Opposition
 Parliamentary opposition
 Political dissent
 The Establishment
 Ruling party

References

 
Political terminology